Bletchley is a railway station that serves the southern parts of Milton Keynes, England (especially Bletchley itself), and the north-eastern parts of Aylesbury Vale.

It includes junctions of the West Coast Main Line with the Bletchley-Bedford Marston Vale Line and the disused Bletchley-Oxford Varsity line. It is the nearest main line station for Bletchley Park (the World War II codebreaking centre and modern heritage attraction) and  Stadium MK (the home of Milton Keynes Dons F.C).

History

The line was fully opened in September 1838, and Bletchley station opened some time between 2 November 1838 and 20 June 1839. The station was known as Bletchley & Fenny Stratford between 1841 and 1846 and after the opening of the Marston Vale line was referred to in timetables as Bletchley Junction from 1851 to 1870. Originally a major intercity station, that role passed to Milton Keynes Central in 1982 when the latter was opened, long after the east–west route had been downgraded, taking Bletchley's importance as a junction with it.

The eastward route (to ) opened in 1846. The westward route (to ) opened in 1850. This east–west route subsequently became the  –  "Varsity Line".

Accidents and incidents
On 14 October 1939, an express passenger train was in a collision with another train. Five people were killed and more than 30 were injured.

Layout and facilities
There are six platforms in use, numbered 1 to 6 from west to east. Platforms 1 and 2, on the fast lines, see little or no use unless other platforms are unavailable. Platforms 3 and 4 serve the WCML slow lines and are used by London Northwestern Railway services between Euston and Birmingham New Street. Platforms 5 and 6 are located on the eastern side and are the only ones that give access to the Marston Vale line to Bedford (though they can also be used exceptionally by main line trains). Bedford trains normally start and terminate at platform 6, but can use platform 5 if required. There is a lift and stairs from the ticket hall to the pedestrian bridge, with lifts and stairs down to each platform. Train arrivals and departures are announced as well as being displayed on VDUs. There are ticket barriers controlling access to the platforms.

There are carriage sidings to the north of the station (along with the Bletchley train maintenance depot). A little to the south, the Bletchley Flyover (under reconstruction) crosses over the main lines to carry East West Rail from Bedford towards Oxford. The main buildings and station entrance are located on the west (Bletchley Park) side of the complex, off Sherwood Drive. An eastern entrance from central Bletchley (see below) is planned and funded.

East West route
As well as being on the national north–south West Coast Main Line, Bletchley is on the former Cambridge–Oxford Varsity line, which closed in 1967. The section between Bletchley and Bedford (the Marston Vale line) survived the closure. Eventually, full services through to Cambridge and the East of England are planned.

East West Rail
 
"East West Rail" is a major project to establish a strategic railway connecting East Anglia with Central, Southern and Western England. In particular, it plans to build (or rebuild) a line linking Oxford and Cambridge via Bicester, Milton Keynes (at Bletchley) and Bedford. The OxfordBedford aspect of the plan reuses the route of the former Varsity Line, extensively re-engineered. There is a funded, scheduled, programme in progress to re-open the BletchleyOxford route to passenger and freight traffic via Bicester by 2025 and a partially funded plan to re-open the entire route between Oxford and Cambridge. A key element of the plan is to extend Bletchley station up to the flyover and build high level platforms (see below) so that passengers may transfer between the lines. The new platforms are to be specified as suitable for trains no longer than four cars.

The Bletchley Flyover from Oxford crosses over the WCML and by-passes the original Bletchley station, leading east towards Bedford or north to join the WCML at a junction north of the current (low-level) station. It was built in 1959 as part of the 1955 British Rail Modernisation Plan. From April 2020 to January 2021, the sections of the original flyover crossing the WCML were removed. The replacement structures were put in place in May 2021. As of October 2022, construction of the new building and the link bridge to the main station is expected to be completed before the end of 2022, ready for handover to the Signalling and Power team.

Marston Vale Community Rail Partnership
Bletchley, in common with other stations on this line, is covered by the Marston Vale Community Rail Partnership, which aims to promote the line by encouraging local users to take an active interest in it.

Planned developments of the station

Proposed entrance from Saxon Street
As part of a project to regenerate Bletchley as a whole, Milton Keynes Council has proposed the creation of a new eastern pedestrian access to the station by extending the existing platform overbridge across the tracks to reach Saxon Street. The proposed eastern entrance is to open out into a new station square and a transport interchange where an at-grade pedestrian crossing across Saxon Street would give access to the town centre and bus station. In the longer term it is planned to construct an underground concourse to link the eastern and western station entrances. 

In March 2021, Milton Keynes Council announced that it had secured funding for a new eastern entrance to the station that will enable direct access from Bletchley bus station and Central Bletchley.

Bletchley High-level

The plan for East West Rail provides for new high level platforms to be built on the eastern approach to the Bletchley Flyover, as the line has no direct route through the existing station without reversing.

On 7 July 2014, the South East Midlands Local Enterprise Partnership announced that the Government had allocated £64.6 million funding for various projects that includes a £1.5 million contribution towards the cost of this work.

In July 2017, Network Rail began a public consultation on the details of its proposals for the Bicester–Bedford section of East West Rail. The consultation documents provide detailed drawings for the high-level platforms but do not include any details about the station itself.

In July 2019, VolkerFitzpatrick announced that it had been awarded a contract to build the new platforms and the link to the mainline station. Work finally began in the station area in mid-2020, when demolition of the original flyover began. Work further around the curve is underway to build two new high-level platforms, to be connected to the main station by extending the existing pedestrian overbridge that gives access to the mainline platforms. In January 2021, piling works began for this extension, At the end of April 2021, the piling and foundation works were complete. By September 2022, shell construction neared completion with fit-out projected through spring 2023.

Services
Services at Bletchley are operated solely by London Northwestern Railway. As of December 2019, the off-peak services (with units in TPH or 'trains per hour') provided by London Northwestern are:

London Northwestern Railway 
 3 tph to 
 1 tph to 
 1 tph to 
 1 tph to 
 1 tph to

Former services

Connex South Central 
In June 1997, Connex South Central began operating services between Gatwick Airport and Rugby via the Brighton and West London Lines which called at Bletchley with Class 319s. It was cut back to terminate at Milton Keynes in December 2000 before being withdrawn in May 2002 due to capacity constraints on the West Coast Main Line while it was upgraded.

Southern 
Southern reintroduced the service in February 2009 with Class 377s operating initially operating from Brighton to Milton Keynes before being curtailed at its southern end at South Croydon and later Clapham Junction. In May 2022, Southern cut the service back to terminate at Watford Junction, thus ceasing to serve Bletchley.

Service summary

Location

The station is on Sherwood Drive in Old Bletchley, near the B4034. The nearest post-code is MK3 6DZ.

See also
 Bletchley Traction Maintenance Depot

Notes

References

External links
 Bletchley station, approaches and sidings on 1952 OS six-inch map (National Library of Scotland)

Railway stations in Buckinghamshire
Former London and Birmingham Railway stations
Railway stations in Great Britain opened in 1839
Railway stations served by West Midlands Trains
Railway stations in Milton Keynes
Bletchley
Buildings and structures in Milton Keynes
DfT Category C2 stations
1939 disasters in the United Kingdom
Stations on the West Coast Main Line